The 2015 European Rally Championship season was the 63rd season of the FIA European Rally Championship, the European continental championship series in rallying. The season was also the third following the merge between the European Rally Championship and the Intercontinental Rally Challenge.

For this year the drivers have to register for the championship, and the categories have been renamed into ERC 1 (for S2000, R5 and RRC (last year) cars), ERC 2 (category for R4 production cars, previously titled N4) and ERC 3 (for R1, R2 and R3 cars).

Calendar

The calendar for the 2015 season featured ten rallies, one less than the 2014 calendar.

Notes:
 – The Acropolis Rally has been moved to October.
 – Tour de Corse was scheduled to be the final event of the season, but the rally organisers moved the rally to the World Rally Championship to replace Rallye de France Alsace. Rallye International du Valais was announced as its replacement.

Selected entries

Results

Championship standings

Drivers' Championship
Last update: Rally du Valais

ERC-2

ERC-3

ERC Junior

ERC Ladies

References

External links
 

 
European Rally Championship
Rally Championship
European Rally Championship seasons